is a former Japanese football player.

Club career
Araiba was a product of the youth system of Gamba Osaka. He made two first team appearances for Gamba in 1997 while he still belonged to their youth team. He signed a professional contract in 1998 and started to play regularly for the club's first team. He played mainly as left midfielder. He moved to Kashima Antlers in 2004. He played as left side-back as Naoki Soma successor. The club won the league champions for 3 years in a row (2007-2009). The club also won 2007, 2010 Emperor's Cup, 2011 and 2012 J.League Cup. He moved to his local Osaka league and signed with Cerezo Osaka in 2013. He retired at the end of the 2014 season.

National team career
In August 1995, Araiba was selected Japan U-17 national team for 1995 U-17 World Championship. He played all 3 matches.

Club statistics

Team honors
 J1 League - 2007, 2008, 2009
 Japanese Super Cup - 2009, 2010
 Emperor's Cup - 2007, 2010
 J.League Cup - 2011, 2012

References

External links

1979 births
Living people
Association football people from Osaka Prefecture
Japanese footballers
Japan youth international footballers
J1 League players
Gamba Osaka players
People from Hirakata
Kashima Antlers players
Cerezo Osaka players
Association football defenders